Lieutenant-General Sir James Robert Steadman Sayer  (13 January 1826 – 12 June 1908) was a British Army officer who became General Officer Commanding Western District.

Sayer was born at Sibton Park, the eldest son of Robert Sayer and Frances Errington.

Military career
Sayer was commissioned as a cornet in the King's Dragoon Guards on 23 May 1845. He served as a junior officer in the Crimean War and subsequently served in the British Indian Army. He became General Officer Commanding Western District in England in April 1883.

He was appointed Colonel of the 8th Hussars for a brief time in 1886. He was then Colonel of the 1st King's Dragoon Guards from 1886 to 1908 and, in that capacity, he was advanced to Knight Commander of the Order of the Bath (KCB) in the 1906 Birthday Honours.

References

|-

|-

1826 births
1908 deaths
Military personnel from Suffolk
British Army generals
Knights Commander of the Order of the Bath
1st King's Dragoon Guards officers